Ungmennafélagið Afturelding, commonly known as Afturelding or UMFA, is an Icelandic multi-sports club from the town of Mosfellsbær located just north of the capital Reykjavík. The club was founded in 1909 and today is primarily known for its handball, football and volleyball teams.

Football
The team plays their home games at artificial pitch Varmárvöllur in Mosfellsbær. The club played previously on a grass pitch at Varmárvöllur but since 2018 all home games have been on the artificial pitch.  The club also has large grass training ground at Tungubakkar.

Men's football

History
In 2005, the club signed future national team goalkeeper Hannes Þór Halldórsson.

In 2007, former Manchester United reserve player Aaron Burns played two games for Afturelding and scored one goal before returning to England.

Afturelding got promoted to the first deild in 2008 but got relegated again in 2009. In 2012, Afturelding finished number five in 2. deild after having a chance of getting promoted before the last round of the league. The team also had a decent cup run which ended when Afturelding lost 3–2 against premier league club Fram at Varmárvöllur. After ten years in 2. deild Afturelding got promoted again by winning the 2. deild in 2018. In 2019 the team finished number eight in the 1. division.

Titles
2. deild karla: 2018
3. deild karla: 1986, 1999
Source

Notable players
 Hannes Þór Halldórsson
 Helgi Sigurðsson

Current squad

Women's football
As of the 2018 season, Afturelding fields a joint team with Fram in the 1. deild kvenna. In September 2021, the team was promoted to the top-tier Besta-deild kvenna after finishing second in the 1. deild kvenna.

Titles
1. deild kvenna: 1995
Source

Notable players
 Cecilía Rán Rúnarsdóttir
 Mist Edvardsdóttir

Handball

Men's handball
Afturelding's men's handball team won its only national championship in 1999. As of the 2018–2019 season, it plays in the Úrvalsdeild karla.

Titles
Icelandic champions: 1999
1. deild karla: 1952, 1955, 1959, 1993, 2007, 2014
2. deild karla: 1985
Source

Women's handball
As of the 2018–2019 season, Afturelding women's team plays in the second-tier 1. deild kvenna.

Volleyball

Men's volleyball

Titles
Icelandic Cup: 2017

Women's volleyball
Afturelding women's team advanced to the Úrvalsdeild finals for the first time in 2012. It won the national championship in 2012, 2014 and 2016.

Titles
Icelandic champions: 2012, 2014, 2016
Icelandic Cup: 2015, 2016, 2017

References

External links
 Official Website

 
Football clubs in Iceland
Association football clubs established in 1909
1909 establishments in Iceland
Handball teams in Iceland
Women's handball clubs